Wa'arat al-Sarris was a Palestinian  village in the Haifa Subdistrict, which was depopulated during the 1948 Palestine war.

History
In the 1931 census of Palestine, conducted by the British Mandate authorities,  it was counted as a part of  Shefa-'Amr suburbs, together with 9 other  villages, and together they had a total of  1197 inhabitants, all Muslim, in  234 houses.

In the 1945 statistics  Wa'rit  Sarris was again counted among  Shefa-'Amr  suburbs, and it was noted with a population of  190 Muslims.

1948, aftermath
During the 1947–1948 Civil War in Mandatory Palestine, there were raids on Arab villages by Jewish forces, which led to flight of the residents and in early January 1948 Hans Moller, the manager of the Ata factory (in modern-day Kiryat Ata) offered the residents of the village to find shelter in his factory, which was near the village, but the residents declined the offer, in fear of being targeted by the Palestinian Arabs and fled to Shefa-'Amr. The village was occupied during April, 1948, during the Battle of Ramat Yohanan between the Jews and the Druze battalion of the Arab Liberation Army. The village was located 11 km east of Haifa.

References

Bibliography

External links
Welcome To Wa'arat al-Sarris
Wa'arat al-Sarris, Zochrot
Survey of Western Palestine, Map 5: IAA, Wikimedia commons
Wa'arat al-Sarris  from the Khalil Sakakini Cultural Center

Arab villages depopulated during the 1948 Arab–Israeli War
District of Haifa